The First Secretary of the North Ossetian regional branch of the Communist Party of the Soviet Union was the position of highest authority in the North Ossetian AO (1924–1936) and the North Ossetian ASSR (1936–1991) in the Russian SFSR of the Soviet Union. The position was created in November 1924, and abolished in August 1991. The First Secretary was a de facto appointed position usually by the Politburo or the General Secretary himself.

List of First Secretaries of the Communist Party of North Ossetia

See also
North Ossetian Autonomous Oblast
North Ossetian Autonomous Soviet Socialist Republic

Notes

Sources
 World Statesmen.org

1924 establishments in the Soviet Union
1991 disestablishments in the Soviet Union
Regional Committees of the Communist Party of the Soviet Union
Politics of North Ossetia–Alania